Baron Lawrence, of the Punjab and of Grateley in the County of Southampton, is a title in the Peerage of the United Kingdom. It was created in 1869 for Sir John Lawrence, 1st Baronet, the former Viceroy of India. He had already been created a Baronet, in 1858. His son, the second Baron, served in the Conservative administrations of Lord Salisbury and Arthur Balfour as a government whip from 1895 to 1905.  the titles are held by his great-grandson, the fifth Baron, who succeeded his father in 1968.

Two other members of the Lawrence family may also be mentioned. Sir Henry Montgomery Lawrence was the elder brother of the first Baron Lawrence. Charles Lawrence, 1st Baron Lawrence of Kingsgate, was a younger son of the first Baron.

Barons Lawrence (1869)
John Laird Lawrence, 1st Baron Lawrence (1811–1879)
John Hamilton Lawrence, 2nd Baron Lawrence (1846–1913)
Alexander Graham Lawrence, 3rd Baron Lawrence (1878–1947)
John Anthony Edward Lawrence, 4th Baron Lawrence (1908–1968)
David John Downer Lawrence, 5th Baron Lawrence (b. 1937)

There is no heir to the titles.

References

Sources

Baronies in the Peerage of the United Kingdom
Noble titles created in 1869